Liptena titei, the Tite's liptena, is a butterfly in the family Lycaenidae. It is found in Nigeria (east and the Cross River loop), western Cameroon and possibly Ivory Coast. The habitat consists of forests.

References

Butterflies described in 1974
Liptena